Aaron Krauter is a North Dakota Democratic-NPL Party politician who served in the North Dakota Senate, representing the 35th district from 1990 to 2002 and the 31st district from 2003 to 2009.  While in the Senate, Krauter served as Assistant Minority Leader from December 1996 until April 17, 1999, when he became minority leader upon Senator Tim Mathern’s resignation. Krauter was Heidi Heitkamp's running mate in the 2000 North Dakota Gubernatorial Election but lost.

References

External links
Aaron Krauter Official Legislative Assembly Biography
Project Vote Smart – Senator Aaron Krauter (ND) profile
Follow the Money – Aaron Krauter
2006 2004 20021998 Senate campaign contributions
2000 Governor/Lt. Governor campaign contributions
North Dakota Democratic-NPL Party – Senator Aaron Krauter profile

Democratic Party North Dakota state senators
1956 births
Living people
People from Dickinson, North Dakota
People from Hettinger County, North Dakota
University of Mary alumni